Massachusetts House of Representatives' 11th Suffolk district in the United States is one of 160 legislative districts included in the lower house of the Massachusetts General Court. It covers part of the city of Boston in Suffolk County. Democrat Liz Malia of Jamaica Plain has represented the district since 1998.

The current district geographic boundary overlaps with those of the Massachusetts Senate's Norfolk and Suffolk district and 2nd Suffolk district.

Representatives
 Amos B. Merrill, circa 1859 
 Pliny Nickerson, circa 1859 
 John Farrington, circa 1858 
 Joseph F. Paul, circa 1858 
 Andreas Blume, circa 1888 
 William Fisher Wharton, circa 1888 
 John W. McCormack, circa 1920 
 James B. Troy, circa 1920 
 George Greene, circa 1951 
 Louis K. Nathanson, circa 1951 
 Kevin W. Fitzgerald, circa 1975 
 Eleanor Myerson, 1983-1991

 Marc D. Draisen, 1991-1995 
 John E. McDonough
 Liz Malia, 1998-2023
 Judith Garcia, 2023-present

See also
 List of Massachusetts House of Representatives elections
 Other Suffolk County districts of the Massachusetts House of Representatives: 1st, 2nd, 3rd, 4th, 5th, 6th, 7th, 8th, 9th, 10th, 12th, 13th, 14th, 15th, 16th, 17th, 18th, 19th
 List of Massachusetts General Courts
 List of former districts of the Massachusetts House of Representatives

Images
Portraits of legislators

References

External links
 Ballotpedia
  (State House district information based on U.S. Census Bureau's American Community Survey).
 League of Women Voters of Boston

House
Government of Suffolk County, Massachusetts